Rebirth is an album by reggae artist Jimmy Cliff released in July 2012. It won the Grammy Award for Best Reggae Album and was included in Rolling Stones '50 Best Albums of 2012'.

Recording and release
Rebirth was Cliff's first new album in eight years. The album was recorded at The Sound Factory and Canyon Hut in California, and produced by Tim Armstrong of Rancid and featured backing band The Engine Room. Some of the songs were written by Cliff before the recordings sessions, while others were written by Cliff and Armstrong in the studio. Rebirth also includes cover versions of The Clash's "Guns of Brixton" (the lyric of which refers to Cliff's role in The Harder They Come), Joe Higgs' "World Upside Down", and Rancid's "Ruby Soho". The album was mastered by Joe LaPorta.

Rebirth was released in July 2012.

Cliff said of the album: "It is a rebirth of my career at this time. I have goals yet to accomplish, and I think this album is the stepping stone toward those goals.". He also said that the title referred to the rebirth of the planet. It also reflected a return to the music from earlier in his career, with Cliff saying: 
"As a rebirth one has to go back to point zero to move forward again. We recorded the music with the same instruments that we had used back in the days, the same style that we used to record, which is everyone recording at the same time."

Critical reception

Rolling Stone gave the album four stars out of five, with Will Hermes describing it as "the strongest case for the vitality of West Indian roots music that anyone has made in decades" and calling it "the sound of history circling in wondrous ways". The BBC commented on his return to the sound of his recordings from the 1960s and 1970s, describing the album as "remarkably consistent". Alternative Press gave it 4.5/5, picking out "Cry No More" and "Children's Bread" as sounding like "lost classic[s] of late-'60s/early-'70s Jamaica", going on to call it "a flawless album". The Independent gave it four stars out of five, saying "the spirit of the music is vivid".

Pitchfork Media rated the album 7.5 out of 10, with reviewer Erin McLeod describing it as "predominantly a pitch-perfect versioning of 1970s reggae". PopMatters gave it 9 out of 10, describing it as "the sound of a man finally getting back to living life to its fullest". AllMusic's David Jeffries gave it 5 stars out of 5, calling it "a return to form".

The album won a Grammy Award in the 'Best Reggae Album' category.

Rebirth was listed at number 12 in Rolling Stones '50 Best Albums of 2012', the album described as a "warm, wondrous album that plays like a guided tour of the island's musical past, as well as Cliff's own". It was also included at number 48 in a similar list from ABC News.

Charts and sales
Rebirth reached number one on the Billboard Top Reggae Albums chart and number 76 on the Billboard 200. It peaked at number 83 in the UK Albums Chart.

By December 2012 the album had sold 33,000 copies in the United States.

Track listing
"World Upside Down" (Cliff, Joe Higgs) - 3:10
"One More" (Cliff) - 3:26
"Cry No More" (Cliff, Tim Armstrong) - 3:18
"Children's Bread" (Cliff, Tim Armstrong) - 4:16
"Bang" (Cliff) - 4:43
"Guns of Brixton" (Paul Simonon) - 3:38
"Reggae Music" (Cliff, Tim Armstrong) - 3:55
"Outsider" (Cliff, Tim Armstrong) - 2:58
"Rebel Rebel" (Cliff) - 3:03
"Ruby Soho" (Lars Frederiksen, Matt Freeman, Tim Armstrong) - 2:53
"Blessed Love" (Cliff) - 4:18
"Ship is Sailing" (Cliff) - 3:06
"One More" (Alternative version) (Cliff) - 3:31

Personnel
Jimmy Cliff - vocals, percussion 
Aimee Allen, Ashli Haynes, Dash Hutton, Jean McClain, Jordis Unga, Nicki Bonner, Tim Hutton - backing vocals
James King - baritone saxophone, tenor saxophone, flute 
J Bonner - bass guitar 
Scott Abels - drums
Tim Armstrong - lead guitar, rhythm guitar 
Dan Boer - organ
Kevin Bivona - piano, guitar
David Moyer, Liam Philpot - saxophone
Jordan Katz, Michael Bolger - trumpet, trombone
Technical
Joe LaPorta - mastering

References

2012 albums
Jimmy Cliff albums